Tandika is an administrative ward in the Temeke district of the Dar es Salaam Region of Tanzania. According to the 2002 census, the ward has a total population of 42,014.

References

Temeke District
Wards of Dar es Salaam Region